People's Car may refer to:

 Volkswagen (German for 'People's Car'), a German automotive manufacturer
 Volkswagen Beetle, the original production car that bore the Volkswagen ('People's Car') name
 Tata Nano, a compact city car advertised as 'The People's Car'